The Soviet occupation of Manchuria took place after the Red Army invaded the Japanese puppet state of Manchukuo in August 1945; the occupation would continue until Soviet forces withdrew in May 1946.

History

On 11 February 1945, the Big Three (Roosevelt, Churchill, and Stalin) signed the Yalta Agreement. Yalta obligated the Soviet Union to enter the war against Japan within three months after Germany's surrender, in exchange for territorial concessions and Soviet influence in post-war Manchuria.

Stalin would order the invasion of Manchukuo on 9 August 1945, according to conditions of Tehran Conference and inaugurated in one of the largest campaigns in the Second World War. The massive Red Army steamrolled into Manchuria, brushing aside scattered Japanese resistance, and occupied Mengjiang (Inner Mongolia), southern Sakhalin, and the northern half of the Korean peninsula as well. The rapid defeat of the Kwantung Army in Manchuria, along with the recent atomic bombing of Hiroshima and Nagasaki by the Americans, contributed significantly to the Japanese surrender on the 15th.

The invasion, along with the surrender, prompted the Kuomintang to jockey for position vis-a-vis the Chinese Communists in mainland China. The Kuomintang signed the Treaty of Friendship and Alliance with the Soviet Union on 14 August 1945, which affirmed Chinese sovereignty over Manchuria in exchange for Chinese recognition of the Soviet-aligned Mongolian People's Republic. The Soviets began withdrawing from Manchuria within three weeks of Japan's surrender, although they would delay the process several times. The resumption of the Chinese Civil War in early 1946 prompted the Red Army to finish the withdrawal, but not before secretly turning Manchuria over to the Chinese Communists in March in violation of the Agreement.

See also
Soviet occupation of Mongolia
Soviet occupations

References

Note

Citations 

Manchuria
Aftermath of World War II in the Soviet Union
Soviet military occupations
China–Soviet Union relations